Renu Bala is an Indian politician from Haryana and a member of the Indian National Congress. She was elected as a member of the Legislative Assembly  from Sadhaura.

References

Indian National Congress politicians from Haryana
Living people
Haryana politicians
Year of birth missing (living people)